Daniel John Sherry (born 2 April 1946) is a male Canadian former swimmer. Sherry competed in five events at the 1964 Summer Olympics.

He broke the world record for 110 yards butterfly in 1965, on his way to winning the ASA National British Championships after setting a time of 58.1 sec, the event was 'open' to all nationalities. He also won the 220 yards butterfly title.

References

1946 births
Living people
Canadian male swimmers
Olympic swimmers of Canada
Swimmers at the 1964 Summer Olympics
Place of birth missing (living people)
Swimmers at the 1963 Pan American Games
Pan American Games bronze medalists for Canada
Pan American Games medalists in swimming
Medalists at the 1963 Pan American Games